The 2011 Internationaux de Nouvelle-Calédonie was a professional tennis tournament played on hard courts. It was the eighth edition of the tournament which is part of the 2011 ATP Challenger Tour. It took place in Nouméa, New Caledonia between 3 and 9 January 2011.

Singles main-draw entrants

Seeds

 Rankings are as of December 27, 2010.

Other entrants
The following players received wildcards into the singles main draw:
  Charles-Antoine Brézac
  Nicolas N'Godrela
  Clément Reix
  Florian Reynet

The following players received entry from the qualifying draw:
  Dominik Meffert
  Amir Weintraub
  Fritz Wolmarans
  Michael Yani

Champions

Singles

 Vincent Millot def.  Gilles Müller, 7–6(7–6), 2–6, 6–4

Doubles

 Dominik Meffert /  Frederik Nielsen def.  Flavio Cipolla /  Simone Vagnozzi, 7–6(7–4), 5–7, [10–5]

External links
Official Website
ITF Search 
ATP official site

Internationaux de Nouvelle-Caledonie
Internationaux de Nouvelle-Caledonie
Internationaux de Nouvelle-Calédonie
Inter